The 1997 Milwaukee Brewers season involved the Brewers finishing third in the American League Central, eight games behind the Cleveland Indians, with a record of 78 wins and 83 losses. 1997 was the Brewers' final season in the American League, before moving to the National League for the following season.

Offseason
 November 27, 1996: Jeff Ware was selected off waivers by the Brewers from the Toronto Blue Jays.
 January 30, 1997: Jack Voigt was signed as a free agent by the Brewers.

Regular season

Season standings

Record vs. opponents

Notable transactions
 August 13, 1997: Julio Franco was signed as a free agent by the Brewers.
 August 14, 1997: Mark Davis was acquired by the Brewers from the Arizona Diamondbacks as part of a conditional deal.

Roster

Player stats

Batting

Starters by position
Note: Pos = Position; G = Games played; AB = At bats; H = Hits; Avg. = Batting average; HR = Home runs; RBI = Runs batted in

Other batters
Note: G = Games played; AB = At bats; H = Hits; Avg. = Batting average; HR = Home runs; RBI = Runs batted in

Pitching

Starting pitchers 
Note: G = Games pitched; IP = Innings pitched; W = Wins; L = Losses; ERA = Earned run average; SO = Strikeouts

Other pitchers 
Note: G = Games pitched; IP = Innings pitched; W = Wins; L = Losses; ERA = Earned run average; SO = Strikeouts

Relief pitchers 
Note: G = Games pitched; W = Wins; L = Losses; SV = Saves; ERA = Earned run average; SO = Strikeouts

Farm system

The Brewers' farm system consisted of seven minor league affiliates in 1997.

Notes

References 
1997 Milwaukee Brewers team page at Baseball Reference
1997 Milwaukee Brewers team page at www.baseball-almanac.com

Milwaukee Brewers seasons
Milwaukee Brewers season
Milwaukee Brew